The Fall Handicap was an American Thoroughbred horse race held annually at Sheepshead Bay Race Track in Sheepshead Bay, Brooklyn, New York from 1894 thru 1909 for horses of either sex age three and older. For easier identification purposes, the race is sometimes referred to as the Coney Island Fall Handicap. For its first two editions, the Fall Handicap was run on the track's short futurity course at 5¾ furlongs then for the next twelve runnings at 6 furlongs and the final two years at 6½ furlongs. The Fall Handicap was the first of the track's autumn serials, preceding the Ocean Handicap at 6½ furlongs and the Omnium Handicap at 1⅛ miles.

Historical notes
Among the winners of the Fall Handicap, the three-year-old colt Ornament won in 1897 and would earn American Horse of the Year and American Champion Three-Year-Old Male Horse honors. The great gelding Roseben won the 1906 running in a year he would dominate American sprint racing. Roseben's successful career would see him inducted into the U.S. Racing Hall of Fame.

In 1895, the American Champion Two-Year-Old Filly of 1894 named The Butterflies defeated future Hall of Fame inductee Domino. In 1904 another filly named Hamburg Belle defeated the 1902 Kentucky Derby winner, Alan-a-Dale who had also run second to the filly Dainty in the second part of the fall serials, the Ocean Handicap.

Demise of the Fall Handicap 
After years of uncertainty, on June 11, 1908 the Republican controlled New York Legislature under Governor Charles Evans Hughes passed the Hart–Agnew anti-betting legislation with penalties allowing for fines and up to a year in prison. The owners of Sheepshead Bay Race Track, and other racing facilities in New York State, struggled to stay in business without income from betting. Racetrack operators had no choice but to drastically reduce the purse money being paid out which resulted in the Fall Handicap offering a purse in 1909 that was nearly one-third of what it had been in earlier years. These small purses made racing horses highly unprofitable and impossible for even the most successful owners to continue in business. As such, for the 1910 racing season management of the Sheepshead Bay facility dropped some of its less important stakes races and used the purse money to bolster its most important events. The effect was to place the Fall Handicap on hiatus. Further restrictive legislation was passed by the New York Legislature in 1910 which deepened the financial crisis for track operators and after a 1911 amendment to the law to limit the liability of owners and directors was defeated, every racetrack in New York State shut down. Owners, whose horses of racing age had nowhere to go, began sending them, their trainers and their jockeys to race in England and France. Many horses ended their racing careers there, and a number remained to become an important part of the European horse breeding industry. Thoroughbred Times reported that  more than 1,500 American horses were sent overseas between 1908 and 1913 and of them at least 24 were either past, present, or future Champions. When a February 21, 1913 ruling by the New York Supreme Court, Appellate Division Court saw horse racing return in 1913 it was too late for the Sheepshead Bay horse racing facility and it never reopened.

Records
Speed record:
  6 furlongs : 1:12.40 – Roseben (1906)

Most wins:
 No horse ever won this race more than once.

Most wins by a jockey:
 2 – Henry Griffin (1894, 1895)
 2 – Lucien Lyne (1904, 1906)

Most wins by a trainer:
 2 – A. Jack Joyner (1894, 1904)
 2 – John Hyland (1895, 1898)

Most wins by an owner:
 2 – August Belmont Jr. (1894, 1908)
 2 – David Gideon & John Daly (1895, 1896)

Winners

Ŧ Raced under the name of Sydney Paget for owner William C. Whitney.

References

Open sprint category horse races
Discontinued horse races in New York City
Sheepshead Bay Race Track
Recurring sporting events established in 1894
Recurring sporting events disestablished in 1909
1894 establishments in New York (state)
1909 disestablishments in New York (state)